This is a list of mayors of Ventura, California, beginning with Ventura's incorporation as a city in 1866.

The individual who had the longest tenure in office was Charles W. Petit, who served as mayor for  years from 1953 to 1969. When Petit left office, he was, at age 87, the oldest mayor in the United States. Prior to Petit, the mayor with the longest tenure was John S. Collins, who held the position for 14 years from 1890 to 1904.

The first woman to serve as mayor was Harriet Kosmo Henson, who served two terms from 1978 to 1982. Since that time, three other women have served as mayor: Christy Weir (2007–2009), Cheryl Heitmann (2013–2015), Sofia Rubalcava (2020-).

The current mayor is Sofia Rubalcava, who assumed the position in December 2020.

See also
 List of mayors of Oxnard, California
 List of mayors of Santa Barbara, California

References

Ventura
Mayors